In the theory of algebraic groups, a Borel subgroup of an algebraic group G is a maximal Zariski closed and connected solvable algebraic subgroup. For example, in the general linear group GLn (n x n invertible matrices), the subgroup of invertible upper triangular matrices is a Borel subgroup.

For groups realized over algebraically closed fields, there is a single conjugacy class of Borel subgroups.

Borel subgroups are one of the two key ingredients in understanding the structure of simple (more generally, reductive) algebraic groups, in Jacques Tits' theory of groups with a (B,N) pair. Here the group B is a Borel subgroup and N is the normalizer of a maximal torus contained in B.

The notion was introduced by Armand Borel, who played a leading role in the development of the theory of algebraic groups.

Parabolic subgroups
Subgroups between a Borel subgroup B and the ambient group G are called parabolic subgroups. 
Parabolic subgroups P are also characterized, among algebraic subgroups, by the condition that G/P is a complete variety. 
Working over algebraically closed fields, the Borel subgroups turn out to be the minimal parabolic subgroups in this sense. Thus B is a Borel subgroup when the homogeneous space G/B is a complete variety which is "as large as possible".

For a simple algebraic group G, the set of conjugacy classes of parabolic subgroups is in bijection with the set of all subsets of nodes of the corresponding Dynkin diagram; the Borel subgroup corresponds to the empty set and G itself corresponding to the set of all nodes. (In general each node of the Dynkin diagram determines a simple negative root and thus a one-dimensional 'root group' of G–a subset of the nodes thus yields a parabolic subgroup, generated by B and the corresponding negative root groups. Moreover, any parabolic subgroup is conjugate to such a parabolic subgroup.)

Example 
Let .

Lie algebra

A Lie subalgebra of  containing a Borel subalgebra is called a parabolic Lie algebra.

See also
 Hyperbolic group
 Cartan subgroup
 Mirabolic subgroup

References

Specific

External links

Algebraic groups